Magnus Westermann (born 13 March 1995) is a Danish swimmer. He competed in the men's 4 × 200 metre freestyle relay event at the 2016 Summer Olympics.

References

External links
 

1995 births
Living people
Olympic swimmers of Denmark
Swimmers at the 2016 Summer Olympics
Place of birth missing (living people)
Danish male freestyle swimmers